There are 75 mammal species in Slovenia, of which seven are vulnerable and four are near threatened.

The following tags are used to highlight each species' conservation status as assessed by the International Union for Conservation of Nature:

Order: Rodentia (rodents) 

Rodents make up the largest order of mammals, with over 40% of mammalian species. They have two incisors in the upper and lower jaw which grow continually and must be kept short by gnawing.

Suborder: Sciurognathi
Family: Castoridae (beavers)
Genus: Castor
 Eurasian beaver, C. fiber 
Family: Sciuridae (squirrels)
Subfamily: Sciurinae
Tribe: Sciurini
Genus: Sciurus
 Red squirrel, Sciurus vulgaris NT
Subfamily: Xerinae
Tribe: Marmotini
Genus: Marmota
 Alpine marmot, Marmota marmota LC
Family: Gliridae (dormice)
Subfamily: Leithiinae
Genus: Dryomys
 Forest dormouse, Dryomys nitedula
Genus: Eliomys
 Garden dormouse, Eliomys quercinus VU
Genus: Muscardinus
 Hazel dormouse, Muscardinus avellanarius
Subfamily: Glirinae
Genus: Glis
 European edible dormouse, Glis glis
Family: Cricetidae
Subfamily: Cricetinae
Genus: Cricetus
European hamster, C. cricetus 
Subfamily: Arvicolinae
Genus: Arvicola
 Water vole, Arvicola terrestris
Genus: Chionomys
 Snow vole, Chionomys nivalis
Genus: Clethrionomys
 Bank vole, Clethrionomys glareolus
Genus: Microtus
 Field vole, Microtus agrestis
 Common vole, Microtus arvalis
 European pine vole, Microtus subterraneus
Family: Muridae (mice, rats, voles, gerbils, hamsters)
Subfamily: Murinae
Genus: Apodemus
 Yellow-necked mouse, Apodemus flavicollis LC
 Wood mouse, Apodemus sylvaticus LC
Genus: Micromys
 Harvest mouse, Micromys minutus
Genus: Mus
 Steppe mouse, Mus spicilegus

Order: Lagomorpha (lagomorphs) 

The lagomorphs comprise two families, Leporidae (hares and rabbits), and Ochotonidae (pikas). Though they can resemble rodents, and were classified as a superfamily in that order until the early 20th century, they have since been considered a separate order. They differ from rodents in a number of physical characteristics, such as having four incisors in the upper jaw rather than two.
Family: Leporidae (rabbits, hares)
Genus: Lepus
European hare, L. europaeus 
Mountain hare, L. timidus

Order: Erinaceomorpha (hedgehogs and gymnures) 

The order Erinaceomorpha contains a single family, Erinaceidae, which comprise the hedgehogs and gymnures. The hedgehogs are easily recognised by their spines while gymnures look more like large rats.
Family: Erinaceidae (hedgehogs)
Subfamily: Erinaceinae
Genus: Erinaceus
 Southern white-breasted hedgehog, E. concolor 
West European hedgehog, E. europaeus

Order: Soricomorpha (shrews, moles, and solenodons) 

The "shrew-forms" are insectivorous mammals. The shrews and solenodons closely resemble mice while the moles are stout-bodied burrowers.
Family: Soricidae (shrews)
Subfamily: Crocidurinae
Genus: Crocidura
 Bicolored shrew, Crocidura leucodon
 Lesser white-toothed shrew, Crocidura suaveolens
Subfamily: Soricinae
Tribe: Nectogalini
Genus: Neomys
 Southern water shrew, Neomys anomalus
 Eurasian water shrew, Neomys fodiens
Tribe: Soricini
Genus: Sorex
 Alpine shrew, Sorex alpinus
 Common shrew, Sorex araneus
Family: Talpidae (moles)
Subfamily: Talpinae
Tribe: Talpini
Genus: Talpa
 Mediterranean mole, Talpa caeca
 European mole, Talpa europaea
 Stankovic's mole, Talpa stankovici

Order: Chiroptera (bats) 

The bats' most distinguishing feature is that their forelimbs are developed as wings, making them the only mammals capable of flight. Bat species account for about 20% of all mammals.
Family: Vespertilionidae
Subfamily: Myotinae
Genus: Myotis
Bechstein's bat, M. bechsteini 
Lesser mouse-eared bat, M. blythii 
Long-fingered bat, M. capaccinii 
Daubenton's bat, M. daubentonii  
Geoffroy's bat, M. emarginatus 
Greater mouse-eared bat, M. myotis 
Whiskered bat, M. mystacinus 
Natterer's bat, M. nattereri 
Subfamily: Vespertilioninae
Genus: Barbastella
Western barbastelle, B. barbastellus 
Genus: Eptesicus
Northern bat, E. nilssoni 
Serotine bat, E. serotinus 
Genus: Hypsugo
Savi's pipistrelle, H. savii 
Genus: Nyctalus
Greater noctule bat, N. lasiopterus 
Lesser noctule, N. leisleri 
Common noctule, N. noctula 
Genus: Pipistrellus
Common pipistrelle, P. pipistrellus 
Kuhl's pipistrelle, P. kuhlii 
Nathusius' pipistrelle, P. nathusii 
Genus: Plecotus
Brown long-eared bat, P. auritus 
Grey long-eared bat, P. austriacus  
Genus: Vespertilio
Parti-coloured bat, V. murinus 
Subfamily: Miniopterinae
Genus: Miniopterus
Common bent-wing bat, M. schreibersii 
Family: Rhinolophidae
Subfamily: Rhinolophinae
Genus: Rhinolophus
Mediterranean horseshoe bat, R. euryale 
Greater horseshoe bat, R. ferrumequinum 
Lesser horseshoe bat, R. hipposideros 
Mehely's horseshoe bat, R. mehelyi

Order: Cetacea (whales) 

The order Cetacea includes whales, dolphins and porpoises. They are the mammals most fully adapted to aquatic life with a spindle-shaped nearly hairless body, protected by a thick layer of blubber, and forelimbs and tail modified to provide propulsion underwater.
Suborder: Mysticeti
Family: Balaenopteridae
Genus: Balaenoptera
 Fin whale, Balaenoptera physalus EN
Suborder: Odontoceti
Superfamily: Platanistoidea
Family: Delphinidae (marine dolphins)
Genus: Delphinus
 Short-beaked common dolphin, Delphinus delphis
Genus: Grampus
 Risso's dolphin, Grampus griseus DD
Genus: Tursiops
 Common bottlenose dolphin, Tursiops truncatus

Order: Carnivora (carnivorans) 

There are over 260 species of carnivorans, the majority of which feed primarily on meat. They have a characteristic skull shape and dentition. 
Suborder: Feliformia
Family: Felidae (cats)
Subfamily: Felinae
Genus: Felis
 European wildcat, F. silvestris 
Genus: Lynx
Eurasian lynx, L. lynx 
Suborder: Caniformia
Family: Canidae (dogs, foxes)
Genus: Vulpes
Red fox, V. vulpes 
Genus: Canis
Golden jackal, C. aureus 
Gray wolf, C. lupus 
Genus: Nyctereutes
 Raccoon dog, N. procyonoides  introduced
Family: Ursidae (bears)
Genus: Ursus
Brown bear, U. arctos 
Family: Mustelidae (mustelids)
Genus: Lutra
Eurasian otter, L. lutra 
Genus: Martes
Beech marten, M. foina 
Genus: Meles
European badger, M. meles 
Genus: Mustela
Stoat, M. erminea 
Least weasel, M. nivalis 
European polecat, M. putorius 
Genus: Neogale
American mink, N. vison  presence uncertain, introduced

Order: Artiodactyla (even-toed ungulates) 

The even-toed ungulates are ungulates whose weight is borne about equally by the third and fourth toes, rather than mostly or entirely by the third as in perissodactyls. There are about 220 artiodactyl species, including many that are of great economic importance to humans.
Family: Suidae (pigs)
Subfamily: Suinae
Genus: Sus
 Wild boar, S. scrofa 
Family: Cervidae (deer)
Subfamily: Cervinae
Genus: Cervus
 Red deer, C. elaphus 
Genus: Dama
 European fallow deer, D. dama 
Subfamily: Capreolinae
Genus: Capreolus
 Roe deer, C. capreolus 
Family: Bovidae (bovids)
Subfamily: Caprinae
Genus: Capra
 Alpine ibex, C. ibex  introduced

Locally extinct 
The following species are locally extinct in the country:
Mediterranean monk seal, Monachus monachus

See also
List of chordate orders
Lists of mammals by region
List of prehistoric mammals
Mammal classification
List of mammals described in the 2000s

Notes

References
 

Slovenia
Mammals in Slovenia
Mammals
Slovenia